In geometry, an  truncated trapezohedron is a polyhedron formed by a  trapezohedron with  pyramids truncated from its two polar axis vertices. If the polar vertices are completely truncated (diminished), a trapezohedron becomes an antiprism.

The vertices exist as 4  in four parallel planes, with alternating orientation in the middle creating the pentagons.

The regular dodecahedron is the most common polyhedron in this class, being a Platonic solid, with 12 congruent pentagonal faces.

A truncated trapezohedron has all vertices with 3 faces. This means that the dual polyhedra, the set of gyroelongated dipyramids, have all triangular faces. For example, the icosahedron is the dual of the dodecahedron.

Forms

Triangular truncated trapezohedron (Dürer's solid) – 6 pentagons, 2 triangles, dual gyroelongated triangular dipyramid
Truncated square trapezohedron – 8 pentagons, 2 squares, dual gyroelongated square dipyramid
Truncated pentagonal trapezohedron or regular dodecahedron – 12 pentagonal faces, dual icosahedron
Truncated hexagonal trapezohedron – 12 pentagons, 2 hexagons, dual gyroelongated hexagonal dipyramid
... 
Truncated n-gonal trapezohedron – 2n pentagons, 2 n-gons, dual gyroelongated dipyramids

See also
 Diminished trapezohedron

External links
Conway Notation for Polyhedra Try: "tndAn", where n=4,5,6... example "t5dA5" is a dodecahedron.

Polyhedra
Truncated tilings